Odcombe is a village and civil parish in south Somerset, England,  west of the town of Yeovil, with a population of 759 in 2011.

The upper part of the village, Higher Odcombe, sits on the crest of the hill, while the lower part, Lower Odcombe, is built on its northern slopes. Odcombe falls within the Yeovil Parliamentary constituency and is covered by the Non-metropolitan district of South Somerset, which was formed on 1 April 1974 under the Local Government Act 1972, having previously been part of Yeovil Rural District. There is a parish council which has responsibility for local issues.

History

The village is mentioned in the Domesday book when it was owned by Robert, Count of Mortain. After the Battle of Hastings in 1066, the Barony of Odcombe was given to Ansgar de Brito (formerly Ansgar de Montacute/Ansgar Deincourt) for valor in battle. Along with the Odcombe Barony, Ansgar de Brito acquired multiple additional holdings within Somersetshire, at which point the Count of Mortain became his overlord.

In the 1860s the village church was redeveloped, during which time the preserved shoes of Thomas Coryat were lost. The village is built predominantly out of the local hamstone still quarried on Ham Hill, two miles to the west.

The parish was part of the hundred of Houndsborough.

Religious sites

The Ham stone Church of St Peter and St Paul has 13th-century origins. In 1874 transepts were added and the church restored. It has been designated as a Grade I listed building. A headstone in yellow Jaisalmer stone lies embedded in the front lawn of the church to mark a memorial service to poet Dom Moraes (1938–2004).

Notable residents

Notable residents of the village include Humphrey Hody, a late 17th-century scholar and theologian, George Strong, a 19th-century soldier awarded the Victoria Cross in the Crimean war, the writer, Hilda Mary Hooke, and Thomas Coryat, a 17th-century traveller and writer; author of  Coryat's Crudities. Coryate described his "...love of Odcombe in Somersetshire, which is so deare unto me that I preferre the very smoke thereof before the fire of all other places under the Sunne"

References

External links

Villages in South Somerset
Civil parishes in Somerset